Monogramma is a genus of ferns belonging to the family Pteridaceae.

Its native range is the Western Indian Ocean, and Malesia.

Species
Species:

Monogramma capillaris 
Monogramma graminea

References

Pteridaceae
Fern genera